This is a list of films which have placed number one at the weekly box office in Australia during 1993. Amounts are in Australian dollars.

Number-one films

Highest-grossing films

References

See also
 List of Australian films - Australian films by year
 Lists of box office number-one films

1993
Australia
1993 in Australian cinema